Crystal Ocean Supri Heavenly Blue Sky Hellman (born 8 November 1971), known shortly as Ocean Hellman, is a Canadian former actress who began her acting career as a child actress when she was 3 years old. Hellman is best known for her role in the television series Danger Bay (1984–1990), for which she was nominated for the Gemini Award for Best Performance by a Lead Actress in a Continuing Dramatic Role.

Filmography

Movies

TV series

Awards and nominations

References

External links 
 

1971 births
Living people
Canadian child actresses
Actresses from Victoria, British Columbia
Canadian television actresses